Satyajit Das (born 1957) is an Australian former banker and corporate treasurer, turned consultant, and author.

Early life and education 
Satyajit Das was born in Calcutta, India in 1957. His family emigrated to Australia when he was 12.

Das received bachelor's degrees in Commerce and Law from the University of New South Wales followed by an MBA from the Australian Graduate School of Management.

Career
From 1977 to 1987, Das worked in banking with the Commonwealth Bank, CitiGroup and Merrill Lynch. From 1988 to 1994, Das was Treasurer of the TNT Transport Group.

Das is the author of Traders, Guns & Money, Extreme Money, and reference books on derivatives and risk management. He lives in Sydney.

Extreme Money was long-listed for the Financial Times/Goldman Sachs Business Book of the Year Award. The Economist reviewed the book, stating that "Satyajit Das is well-placed to comment, having worked both for investment banks and as a consultant advising clients on their use of complex financial products"; however "the book could have easily been 150 pages shorter without losing its thrust".

A Banquet of Consequences was released in Australia in 2015. In 2016 it was released in the United States and India as The Age of Stagnation "to increase confusion and avoid it being mistaken for a cookbook".

Das is a regular commentator on Late Night Live on Radio National, hosted by Phillip Adams.

Selected publications

References

Living people
1957 births
Businesspeople from Kolkata
Businesspeople from Sydney
University of New South Wales alumni
Australian bankers
Australian people of Indian descent
Australian columnists
People educated at North Sydney Boys High School